The Winchcombe Annals or sometimes Later Winchcombe Annals are a chronicle compiled  by an anonymous monk at the Benedictine abbey, Winchcombe Abbey.

The manuscript is damaged and only the portion from  1049 to 1232 remain although it was a longer document. The source material up to 1181 is from the Winchcombe Chronicle and from thereon from another annal. The manuscript also holds pictorial representation of a sun dial, and the twelve winds of Aristotle.

It is currently in the British Library at Cotton MS Faustina B I, fol. 12r–29v.

References

Benedictine scholars
Benedictine writers
13th-century English historians
English Benedictines
English chronicles
Medieval Latin historical texts
12th-century history books
12th-century Latin books
Old English literature
English non-fiction literature
13th century in England
12th century in England
History of Gloucestershire
13th-century Latin books
Cotton Library
Winchcombe